The following highways are numbered 637:

Canada
Ontario Highway 637
Saskatchewan Highway 637

Ireland
R637 road (Ireland)

United States